Dorcas Nakhumicha Ndasaba (born 31 March 1971) is a former Kenyan volleyball player. She was part of the Kenya women's national volleyball team.

Life
She participated in the 1998 FIVB Volleyball Women's World Championship, and in the 2002 FIVB Volleyball Women's World Championship.
She competed with the national team at the 2000 Summer Olympics in Sydney, and at the 2004 Summer Olympics, both times finishing 11th.

In 2007 under there then Kenyan national coach Sammy Kirongo led them to a seventh victory at the Women's African Volleyball Championship in Nairobi and the final was against Algeria. The Kenyan team included Brackcides Agala, Janet Wanja, Dorcas Ndasaba and Catherine Wanjiru. Ndasaba was judged best player after she gained the final point to deliver victory in straight sets.

References

External links
http://www.fivb.org/EN/volleyball/competitions/olympics/2004/women/Teams/Team_Roster.asp?code=KEN&sm=64
https://web.archive.org/web/20161024121558/http://www.todor66.com/volleyball/Olympics/Women_2000.html

1971 births
Living people
Kenyan women's volleyball players
Place of birth missing (living people)
Volleyball players at the 2000 Summer Olympics
Volleyball players at the 2004 Summer Olympics
Olympic volleyball players of Kenya
African Games bronze medalists for Kenya
African Games medalists in volleyball
Competitors at the 2011 All-Africa Games